Cadillac is a 1989 album recorded by French singer Johnny Hallyday. It was released in June 1989 and achieved success in France, where it debuted at #1 for eight consecutive weeks on the SNEP albums chart on July 2, 1989, and totalled 61 weeks in the top 50. It provided five singles in France, including a top three hit: "Mirador" (#3), "Si j'étais moi" (#25), "Les Vautours..." (#30), "Himalaya" (#30) and "Cadillac" (#39). The lyrics were written by Étienne Roda-Gil, who had worked in the 1980s with Vanessa Paradis, and the music was composed and arranged by Jacques Cardona, David Hallyday, Georges Augier, Jean-Pierre Bucolo and Jean-Claude Petit. This album was inspired by Antoine Laumet de La Mothe, sieur de Cadillac, a French who founded Detroit in 1701 and who gave his name to the brand of luxury vehicles.

Track listing
 "Les Vautours..." (Jacques Cardona, Étienne Roda-Gil) — 4:49
 "Mirador" (David Hallyday, Roda-Gil) — 4:21
 "Rien à jeter" (Georges Augier De Moussac, Jean-Pierre Bucolo, Cardona, Roda-Gil) — 3:37
 "Himalaya" (Augier, Bucolo, Roda-Gil) — 4:43
 "Possible en moto" (Hallyday, Roda-Gil) — 4:18
 "Cadillac" (Augier, Bucolo, Roda-Gil) — 4:47
 "Si j'étais moi" (Bucolo, Roda-Gil) — 4:03
 "L'Étoile solitaire" (Bucolo, Roda-Gil) — 3:33
 "C'est du vent" (Augier, Bucolo, Roda-Gil) — 4:12
 "Testament d'un poète" (Jean-Claude Petit, Roda-Gil) — 1:43

Source : Allmusic.

Personnel
 Produced by Etienne Roda-Gil
 Musical direction: Jean-Pierre Bucolo
 Recording: Jean-Pierre Janiaud and Olivier Do Esperito Santo
 Mixing: Jean-Pierre Janiaud
 Recorded at Studio Gang
Tony Frank - photography

Releases

Certifications

Charts

References

1989 albums
Johnny Hallyday albums
Mercury Records albums